Charles Frank Newman (November 5, 1868 – November 23, 1947) was a Major League Baseball outfielder.

Biography
Newman was born in Juda, Wisconsin. He married Fannie Tilley in 1890, was widowed in 1936, and then married Mary Martin in 1939. Newman played professional baseball in the 1890s. He then served as chief of police in Janesville, Wisconsin from 1921 to 1937. He moved to California in 1938 and died in San Diego. He was buried in Albany, Wisconsin.

Sources

External links

 

1868 births
1947 deaths
19th-century baseball players
Baseball players from Wisconsin
Burlington Hawkeyes players
Chicago Colts players
Detroit Tigers (Western League) players
Grand Rapids Shamrocks players
Jacksonville Jacks players
Major League Baseball outfielders
Memphis Fever Germs players
Minneapolis Minnies players
Milwaukee Brewers (minor league) players
Nashville Tigers players
New York Giants (NL) players
People from Green County, Wisconsin
Rockford Forest City players
Rockford Forest Citys players
Seattle Reds players
People from Janesville, Wisconsin
Seattle Hustlers players